William Ellerington (January quarter 1892 – October quarter 1948) was an English professional footballer who played as a centre-half. He played over 150 matches in the Football League for Middlesbrough and Nelson. His son, also called Bill, played for England and Southampton.

References

1892 births
1948 deaths
People from Warwickshire
English footballers
English football managers
Association football defenders
Darlington F.C. players
Middlesbrough F.C. players
Nelson F.C. players
Mid Rhondda F.C. players
Ebbw Vale F.C. players
Basingstoke Town F.C. players
English Football League players
Southampton F.C. wartime guest players
Ebbw Vale F.C. managers